This is a chronological list of those who have served as Mayor of Exeter (and from 2002 as Lord Mayor), in the city of Exeter, England.

Mayors of Exeter

Lord Mayors of Exeter
2001: Granville Baldwin – first Lord Mayor
2002: Val Dixon
2003: Margaret Danks
2004: Hilda Sterry
2005: Peter Wadham
2006: Norman Shiel
2007: Hazel Slack – runs a nursery shop in the city. 
2008: Paul Smith
2009: John Winterbottom – former financial adviser. 
2010: Marcel Choules – has been a fairground booth fighter, bouncer and chef. 
2011: Stella Brock
2012: Rob Newby
2013: Rachel Lyons – former nurse
2014: Percy Prowse
2015: Olwen Margaret Foggin
2016: Cynthia Thompson 
2017: Lesley Robson
2018: Rob Hannaford
2019: Peter Holland - former headteacher and postman.
2021: Trish Oliver
2022: Yolonda Henson

References

Exeter
Exeter-related lists
 
Politics of Exeter